David Sharpe (born 11 May 1991) has been the chief executive and director of football of English football club Mansfield Town since May 2020. He was formerly chairman of Wigan Athletic (2015–2019).

Sharpe was born in Wigan. He was educated at Shrewsbury School, and then studied business at Oxford Brookes University. Sharpe's grandfather is Dave Whelan, who took control of Wigan Athletic in February 1995. Whelan made Sharpe a director at Wigan in December 2014, and was appointed as chairman after Whelan's resignation in March 2015. At the age of 23, he became one of the world's youngest football bosses. Sharpe's appointment came with shock and scepticism from both fans and the media as the youngest chairman in English football.

References

External links 
 Chairman David Sharpe to leave Wigan Athletic following sale November 2018
 @DavidSharpe91, Twitter
 @davidsharpe_wafc, Instagram

Living people
1991 births
English football chairmen and investors
Chairmen of Wigan Athletic F.C.